Lakshana may refer to:
Lakshana,a Hindu philosophy
Lakshana (actress)